The Other Side of the Law is the debut studio album by American rap group Facemob. It was released on August 13, 1996 through Rap-A-Lot Records. Recording sessions took place at the Hippie House studios in Houston and at the Enterprise in Burbank. Production was primarily handled by Scarface and Mike Dean with Uncle Eddie, Domo and N.O. Joe. The album peaked at number 51 on the Billboard 200 and at number 6 on the Top R&B/Hip-Hop Albums in the United States.

Track listing
"Intro"- 0:42
"In the Flesh"- 4:53
"Bank Robbery"- 5:19
"Da Coldest"- 5:31
"Millions"- 5:03
"Tales from the Hood"- 3:56
"Respect Rude"- 5:00
"Stay True"- 5:16
"The Other Side"- 4:32
"Black Woman"- 5:06
"Rivals"- 4:20
"Outro"- 0:52

Personnel
Artwork By [Direction, Design] – Jason Clark
Engineer [Assistant] – Andre "007" Barnes
Engineer [Mix Engineer Assistant] – Jeff Griffin
Engineer, Mixed By – Mike Dean
Executive Producer – Scarface, James A. Smith
Management – BW Harris
Mastered By – Anthony Valcic
Mixed By, Other [Production Coordinator] – Scarface
Other [Production Coordinator] – Rodney Wilson
Photography – Mario Castellanos

Charts

Weekly charts

Year-end charts

References

External links

Facemob albums
1996 debut albums
Rap-A-Lot Records albums
Albums produced by N.O. Joe
Albums produced by Mike Dean (record producer)